Seremban may refer to:
Seremban
Seremban District
Seremban (federal constituency), represented in the Dewan Rakyat
Seremban Barat (federal constituency), formerly represented in the Dewan Rakyat (1959–74)
Seremban Timor (federal constituency), formerly represented in the Dewan Rakyat (1959–74)
Seremban (state constituency), formerly represented in the Negeri Sembilan State Council (1955–59)